Do It for Yourself is a Canadian television home improvement series hosted by Mary Bellows. It first premiered on CBC on September 13, 1982. The series ended on December 1, 1983 with 278 episodes. The program was one of the top run daytime shows in Canada and was sold in 1985 to a broadcast group which then aired the series on USA network, Lifetime and PBS in the United States.

Cast
 Mary Bellows .... Host
John Reeves .... Plant Expert
Ken Reeves .... Plant Expert
Zeke .... puppy No. 1
Hoover .... puppy No. 2

Episode guide

Season 1 (1982)

Season 2 (1983)

Season 3 (1983)

Book
In 1987, Bellows published a 64-page paperback book with all her handy tips and tricks from her home improvement TV show. The book was published in English by Methuem.

References

External links

TV Archive - Episode Guide

1982 Canadian television series debuts
1985 Canadian television series endings
1980s Canadian reality television series
CBC Television original programming